Yeh Jawaani Hai Deewani, also abbreviated as YJHD, is a 2013 Indian Hindi-language coming-of-age romantic comedy-drama film directed by Ayan Mukerji, written by Mukerji and Hussain Dalal, and produced by Karan Johar. It stars Ranbir Kapoor and Deepika Padukone in their second film together after Bachna Ae Haseeno (2008), with Kalki Koechlin and Aditya Roy Kapur in pivotal supporting roles. The story revolves around Naina Talwar and Kabir Thapar who meet during a trekking trip where she falls in love with him but refrains from expressing it. They soon drift apart but end up meeting at a friend's wedding.

Initially set for a March 2013 release, Yeh Jawaani Hai Deewani released on 31 May 2013. Upon release, it was a major box office success, becoming a highly popular film amongst the youth. It is currently the 44th highest grossing Indian film of all time. It was the third film to cross 300 crore worldwide after 3 Idiots (2009) and Ek Tha Tiger (2012). It was also the tenth highest grossing Indian film in overseas markets at the time of release. It received positive reviews from critics, with praise for its direction, story, screenplay, soundtrack, cinematography, production design, costumes and performances of the cast.

At the 59th Filmfare Awards, Yeh Jawaani Hai Deewani received a leading 10 nominations, including Best Film, Best Director (Mukerji), Best Actor (Kapoor), Best Actress (Padukone), Best Supporting Actress (Koechlin) and Best Supporting Actor (Roy Kapur). 

Since its release in 2013, Yeh Jawaani Hai Deewani has achieved cult status.

Plot
Naina Talwar is a medical student absorbed in her studies. She tops her classes but feels like an outcast due to her introverted nature. An encounter with an old classmate, Aditi Mehra, makes her realize that she wants more from life than high marks. Thus, she makes an impulsive decision to follow Aditi on a hiking trip into the Himalayas, up to Manali. During the hike, she renews her friendship with other former classmates, Kabir "Bunny" Thapar and Avinash "Avi" Shiv. Bunny is a charmer whose dream is to wander and discover the world and has no interest in ever settling down, while Avi is a playboy who is addicted to alcohol and betting.

Throughout the trek, Bunny and Naina grow closer. One night, the two climb a mountain and Naina sees a new side of Bunny, causing her to grow feelings for him. Meanwhile, Aditi grows jealous of Preeti, one of their acquaintances, as Avi flirts with her a lot. Bunny and Naina realize that Aditi has feelings for Avi, but keep quiet. At the end of the trip, Naina is close to telling Bunny that she has feelings for him, but is interrupted by Avi who reveals that Bunny has been accepted into the school of journalism at Northwestern University in Chicago. Naina realizes that love and marriage have no part in Bunny's plans and remains silent but is happy for him as he is following his passion.

Eight years later, Naina has finished medical school and is now working in a clinic. Bunny works as a videographer for a travel show on FOX Network, hosted by his colleague Riana Sarai, and travels the world as he had always wanted. He receives an offer from Riana, who now has become a good friend of his, to become a host for a new travel show, which he accepts. He also receives a wedding invitation from Aditi, informing him that she is marrying a wealthy engineer, Taran Khanna. Bunny comes to Rajasthan for Aditi's destination wedding, and while the girls are happy to see him, Avi acts repulsive since Bunny avoided his calls and never bothered to stay in touch with him. Later, in a conversation with Naina, Bunny reveals that his father Sanjay had passed away and since he had been on a trek in a no-network zone, he couldn't make it to Sanjay's last rites.

Naina and Bunny spend time together, and Naina's feelings for Bunny grow once again, and Bunny too finds himself becoming attracted to Naina. However, she doesn't want to get her heart broken again, leading herself to avoid hanging out with Bunny. Later, Bunny sees Aditi fighting with Taran, and thinks they were fighting because Taran was jealous of Avi and Aditi. But Aditi reassures Bunny it was because she wanted to slap Avi for splurging excessively on booze and poker, while Taran paid it all off and was trying to stop her from insulting Avi. Bunny asks Aditi about her crush on Avi, but she says that she has gotten over him and is much happier with Taran. Bunny then realizes that he feels the same way about Naina and goes to see her with two drinks in his hand. Bunny sees Naina with another man, Naina's friend Vikram, and feels jealous, causing Bunny and Naina to argue. While in the midst of arguing Naina tells Bunny that she can't keep on hanging out with him, because she will fall in love with him again, and he won't again. Bunny eventually comes closer to Naina and kisses her. Afterwards, Bunny and Naina admit they love each other, but neither is willing to give up a career to follow the other. Naina says she is happy staying with her family, living her simple life and doesn't want to leave whereas Bunny wants to always be on the move and see the world. Naina decides that it's best that they forget each other, and they embrace each other in a tearful goodbye.

On the night of Aditi's wedding, Bunny leaves for Paris. At the airport, he realizes the importance of what he is leaving behind and instead goes to his home, where he reconciles with his stepmother Shivani. On New Year's Eve, Naina, alone at home, receives a surprise visit from Bunny. He explains he has turned down his dream job to be with her and proposes spontaneously, but Naina fears that he might regret his decision later. Bunny counters that he is happy with her and wants to continue travelling – but with her, arguing that somehow they can make a life together. Naina concedes, and they have a conference call with Aditi and Avi. Aditi and Avi are happy to know that Naina and Bunny are together, and they all are having a great phone call together. They all wish each other Happy New Year and the film ends with Bunny and Naina embracing.

Cast
 Ranbir Kapoor as Kabir "Bunny" Thapar
 Deepika Padukone as Dr. Naina Talwar
 Kalki Koechlin as Aditi "Adi" Mehra Khanna
 Aditya Roy Kapur as Avinash "Avi" Shiv Arora
 Evelyn Sharma as Lara Khanna, Taran's cousin
 Kunaal Roy Kapur as Taran Khanna, Aditi's husband
 Farooq Sheikh as Sanjay Thapar, Bunny's father 
 Tanvi Azmi as Shivani Thapar, Bunny's step mother
 Dolly Ahluwalia as Simran Talwar, Naina's mother
 Poorna Jagannathan as Riana Sarai, Bunny's tour coordinator 
 Madhuri Dixit in a special appearance as Mohini in "Ghagra"
 Rana Daggubati as photographer Vikram Jaiswal (cameo appearance)
 Naveen Kaushik as Sumer Kashyap
 Umar Yadav as Nanoo
 Omar Khan as Dev Johnson
 Anisa Butt as Preeti Salgaonkar
 Nupur Joshi as Esha
 Mayank Saxena
 Mokshad Dodwani
 Kamal Adib as Harish Mehra
 Rashmi Desai - cameo with Evelyn Sharma
 Nirmal Soni
 Samarth Chaudhary as Professor

Production

Development 
Yeh Jawaani Hai Deewani was produced by Hiroo Yash Johar and Karan Johar under the banner of Dharma Productions. It was co-produced by Apoorva Mehta and UTV Motion Pictures and written by Hussain Dalal based on a story by Ayan Mukerji. The title was taken from a hit song by the same title, with music by R. D. Burman from the film Jawani Diwani (1972). In December 2011, Pritam was chosen for the first time to compose the music for a Dharma Productions film, steering away from the usual Vishal–Shekhar and Shankar–Ehsaan–Loy, who had previously scored director Ayan Mukerji's debut, Wake Up Sid (2009).

Casting
Ranbir Kapoor was the first to sign onto the film and was under Ayan Mukerji's direction for the second time following Wake Up Sid (2009). Kapoor pierced his ears for his role. There was a lot of speculation as to who would play the female lead, with Katrina Kaif and Anushka Sharma being the choices. Eventually, Deepika Padukone was chosen in September 2011, who due to her faith in Kapoor and Mukerji accepted the film without even reading the script. Kalki Koechlin and Aditya Roy Kapur were later signed on for the roles of Aditi and Avi, respectively. Evelyn Sharma had confirmed that she will play a ditzy character.

Filming
Shooting locations included Hidimba Temple, Gulaba, Banjaar, Hamta, and Naggar. Some shots were taken at 14,000 feet above sea level and the crew shot at a temperature as low as −10 degrees Celsius. In May 2012, the cast filmed in Udaipur, where Kapoor and Padukone also shot a romantic song. The wedding sequences were shot at the Oberoi Udaivilas hotel.

The unit experienced a difficult shoot in Rajasthan due to the overwhelming heat. Filming also took place in August 2012 in Paris, France on Rue Mouffetard, a street market and in Nice, France. Other scenes were shot in Filmistan, Mumbai. On 26 January, the crew visited Kashmir to shoot a musical sequence and other scenes. They filmed in locations such as Kongdori in Gulmarg, Pahalgam and Srinagar.

Music

The soundtrack and film score were composed by Pritam. The album featured nine tracks; lyrics for eight tracks were written by Amitabh Bhattacharya, whereas one song "Dilliwaali Girlfriend" was written by Kumaar. T-Series purchased the film's music rights. The soundtrack album was released through ITunes on 28 April 2013, for paid subscribers and was officially released through digital and physical formats, the following day (29 April 2013). The tracks "Badtameez Dil" and "Balam Pichkari" topped the music charts upon release and became chartbusters.

Marketing
Nokia India announced its association with Dharma Productions for the film. The official trailer was released by Ayan Mukerji, Karan Johar, Ranbir Kapoor and Deepika Padukone on 19 March 2013 at a press conference in Mumbai. Before its release, Kapoor invited all of his fans to watch the trailer.

Pre-release records

 The figures don't include the Print and Advertising (P&A) costs.

Release
Preview screenings of Yeh Jawaani Hai Deewani were held on 30 May 2013. The film was released on 31 May 2013 worldwide and on around 3100 screens in India. The trailers of Bhaag Milkha Bhaag, Chennai Express, Once Upon ay Time in Mumbaai Dobaara! and Satyagraha – Democracy Under Fire were released with the film prints.

Eros distributed Yeh Jawaani Hai Deewani in Israel. It was subtitled in Hebrew and released on 31 May 2013. The last Bollywood film released in Israel was Devdas (2002).

Hindu College organized a special screening of Yeh Jawaani Hai Deewani to create a secure and safe environment for female students on 31 May 2013.

Critical reception 
Yeh Jawaani Hai Deewani received positive reviews from critics, with praise for its direction, story, screenplay, soundtrack, cinematography, production design, costumes and performances of the cast. 

Giving 4 out of 5 stars, Taran Adarsh of bollywoodhungama.com noted that it "is a revitalizing take on romance and relationships. A wonderful cinematic experience, this one should strike a chord with not just the youth, but cineastes of all age-groups." Shubhra Gupta of Indian Express with a negative tone stated that, "Yeh Jawaani Hai Deewani is a been-here, seen-this, much-too-long glossy creature, and not much else." Saibal Chatterjee of NDTV rated it 3.5/5 and opined that, "Overlong, sluggish and fluffy, it meanders through varied locations as the young lovers/friends seek to reconnect with each other after a few years of being apart." Sukanya Verma of Rediff.com gave it 3.5/5 stars and judged, "Yeh Jaawani Hai Deewani is totally worth it!" Alisha Coelho of in.com praised Kapoor's "ebullient" performance and gave it 3.5 stars out of 5. 

Rajeev Masand of CNN-IBN gave the film 3 out of 5 stars, concluding "If you are seeking light-hearted mush, you're looking in the right place". Ananya Bhattacharya of ZEENEWS.com said the film "is no heavy or preachy business. It is meant to be enjoyed and it does its job well. Apart from a few parts where the pace of the film drops badly, Mukerji's handiwork is a breezy, enjoyable one." She also gave it 3 out of 5 stars. Tushar Joshi of DNA opined, "YJHD is a well written film that should be watched for its direction, treatment and some remarkable performances." Anupama Chopra of the Hindustan Times gave 2.5 out of 5 stars and wrote, "there is enough eye-candy in Yeh Jawaani Hai Deewani to see you through, but I wish the film had more meat and less dressing. I'm disappointed because there is a truckload of talent here. What rankles is what might have been." Raja Sen of Rediff.com noted that the film was good-looking but lacked a good story. He gave it 2 out of 5 stars.

Controversies
Jammu and Kashmir Chief Minister Omar Abdullah expressed his displeasure over the attribution of shots in Yeh Jawaani Hai Deewani to Manali while they were filmed in north Kashmir's Gulmarg. He stated that apart from the temple and Span resort, all scenes were shot in Gulmarg. Many scenes and song sequences of the movie were shot at locations in the Kashmir Valley including the famous ski-resort of Gulmarg and Pahalgam. Karan Johar's production house later said that the opening credit slate clearly mentions Chief Minister Omar Abdullah, Tourism Minister GA Mir and Inspector-General of Police SM Sahal. The names of the entire crew in Kashmir are mentioned in the film credits.

The film's television release had been stalled. The Delhi High Court on 11 June 2013 issued a ruling restraining the TV release of Yeh Jawaani Hai Deewani for allegedly using objectionable dialogues in context of the brand Rooh Afza.

Box office

India
Yeh Jawaani Hai Deewani opened strongly with around 100% occupancy at multiplexes and in the range of 60–70% at single screens where it set the biggest opening for a Ranbir Kapoor film. It holds the records for the fourth biggest opening of all time and highest for a non-holiday release after collecting  on its first day. The film remained strong on Saturday and grossed . It made  on its first weekend, breaking the 3-day weekend box office record previously held by Dabangg 2 (2012).

Yeh Jawaani Hai Deewani grossed  in its first week, becoming the second fastest Hindi film to cross  behind Ek Tha Tiger (2012). It grossed  worldwide in the first seven days. Yeh Jawaani Hai Deewani grossed  after its fourth weekend.

Other territories
Yeh Jawaani Hai Deewani collected around $4 million on its international opening weekend and is ranked #2 in 2013. The film collected $1,568,677 at the US box office, opening in at #9 position with an average of $9,743 from 161 theatres. It continued its successful run and netted around $7.5 million in ten days. Yeh Jawaani Hai Deewani grossed $8.75 million in 17 days in overseas. It grossed $9.50 million in 24 days in overseas. Yeh Jawaani Hai Deewani finished at $10.50 million approx.

Home Media
Yeh Jawaani Hai Deewani is available on Netflix and Amazon Prime Video.

Awards and nominations

References

External links

 
 Yeh Jawani Hai Deewani at Internet Movie Database
 
 

2010s Hindi-language films
2010s buddy comedy films
2010s coming-of-age comedy-drama films
2013 romantic comedy-drama films
2013 films
Indian buddy comedy-drama films
Films featuring songs by Pritam
Films shot in Maharashtra
Films shot in Jammu and Kashmir
Films shot in Rajasthan
Indian romantic comedy-drama films
Indian coming-of-age comedy-drama films
Films set around New Year
UTV Motion Pictures films
Films set in Manali, Himachal Pradesh
Films set in Himachal Pradesh
2013 comedy films
2013 drama films
Films directed by Ayan Mukerji